The 369th (Croatian) Reinforced Infantry Regiment was a regiment of the German Army raised to fight on the Eastern Front during World War II. The regiment was formed in July 1941 by Croatian volunteers from the Independent State of Croatia (NDH), including a Bosnian Muslim battalion. It was commonly referred to as the Croatian Legion (Hrvatska Legija). The troops swore a joint oath of allegiance to the Führer (leader of Germany), the Poglavnik (leader of Croatia), the German Reich and the NDH. The unit was sent to the Russian front where it was attached to the 100th Jäger Division. In 1943, as part of the 6th Army. It was the only non-German unit to participate in the battle of Stalingrad where it was virtually destroyed. On 31 January 1943, the 800 surviving Croatian legionaries, led by their commander Marko Mesić, surrendered to the Red Army.

Background

On 10 April 1941, the Independent State of Croatia (NDH, Croatian: Nezavisna Država Hrvatska) was created as a puppet state aligned to the occupying Germans. The Ustaše fascist government of the NDH asked Germany for military assistance as they feared Italian territorial ambitions after ceding much of the coastal area of Dalmatia to Italy in treaties signed on 18 May 1941. By 25 June 1941, Poglavnik Ante Pavelić, the leader of the NDH, had sent an envoy to Berlin to offer volunteers to serve on the Eastern Front. By 2 July, Hitler accepted the offer, and military units were formed under the supervision of two German army officers. The NDH viewed this as a means of strengthening its ties with Germany, potentially an ally in resisting further territorial losses to Italy.

Formation 
Although the NDH considered the unit to be a part of the Croatian Home Guard and the NDH authorities retained responsibility for providing replacements, the regiment's members swore an oath to Adolf Hitler. Whilst not officially part of the Wehrmacht, the regiment was under German military jurisdiction and direct German command throughout its existence, serving as part of the 100th Jäger Division. All soldiers wore Wehrmacht uniforms with a Croatian checkerboard patch incorporating the word Hrvatska (Croatia) on the upper right sleeve and right side of their helmets.

Initially, two battalions were raised and formed into a regiment at Varaždin. This was followed by the raising of a third battalion at Sarajevo. Only Croats, Ukrainians and White Russians were accepted as volunteers, and about one third of those accepted were Bosnian Muslims, who were mostly admitted into the 1st battalion. As the volunteers were promised high salaries and financial assistance to their families, the enrolment figures were relatively good. A training battalion was formed for the regiment in Stockerau, Austria. The regiment was then transported to Döllersheim, Austria for training. With an effective strength of 5,000, the regiment consisted of three infantry battalions, a machine-gun company, an anti-tank company, three field artillery batteries, a headquarters staff and a supply company.

On 21 August 1941, the regiment was transported to Romania. From there, it spent several weeks marching on foot to the front line. On 10 October, the regiment linked up on the line of the Dnieper River with the 100th Jäger Division, which was then part of the 17th Army, Army Group South.

Military action on Eastern Front
To accustom the regiment to the conditions and divisional procedures and further progress their training, the regiment's units were initially divided up among other regiments of the division immediately after their arrival on the front line near Kharkov. The divisional diary recorded that the main goal for units of the regiment during this period was to improve discipline across various areas. To improve poor discipline, on 30 September 1941, Colonel Ivan Markulj sent 43 officers and NCOs as well as 144 soldiers back to the NDH due to illness and/or for disciplinary reasons.

After the Red Army counterattacked and re-took Rostov in November 1941, the 100th Jäger Division marched south to the front line on the Mius River on 22 November. Temperatures dropped as low as -18C, and the regiment had no winter clothing. The regiment's units, still divided among the other regiments of the division, dug in alongside the Slovak Mobile Brigade and SS-Division Wiking. In mid-January 1942, the 100th Light Infantry Division was deployed to the Stalino area to assist in fighting off a Soviet cavalry corps that had broken through the front line. Through some heavy fighting along the line of the Samara River, the division held on through the winter.

Starting in early 1942, soldiers were able to send messages back to the Independent State of Croatia. Troops wrote letters for family members and friends on any paper they could find, such as cigarette papers or pages torn from notebooks. Radio Zagreb (later known as Hrvatski Krugoval) broadcast communications from the regiment's soldiers, alongside propaganda announcements that praised the Croatian authorities and did not mention the soldiers' fate – most often death or capture.

Generalleutnant Werner Sanne, the 100th Jäger Division's commander, commended the regiment's successes over the winter, especially the actions of Lieutenant Colonel Marko Mesić's artillery battalion on 21–22 February 1942. On 23 February 1942, Sanne awarded Mesić the Iron Cross.

In April 1942, four soldiers of the regiment were sentenced to death and shot, while many others were sentenced to imprisonment of between 2–10 years.

From mid-May 1942, the regiment was reunited under Colonel Markulj, after which the 100th Jäger Division joined in the final phases of the pincer attack on the Red Army bridgehead at Kharkov. In June, the division supported the 1st Panzer Army's drive along the Don River, through Voronezh to Kalach where the regiment incurred heavy casualties trying to cross the river in the face of serious resistance.

After the Second Battle of Kharkov, Colonel Markulj, Lieutenant Eduard Bakarec and six other regiment officers were awarded the Iron Cross First Class. A report dated 21 June 1942 states that Legion contained 113 officers, 7 military clerks, 625 NCOs, and 4,317 soldiers, as well as 2,902 horses.

After participating in mopping-up operations in along the Don, the division rested briefly in September, and the regiment was re-organised after receiving some reinforcements.

Markulj was transferred back to Croatia and was temporarily replaced by Colonel Marko Mesić on 7 July 1942 and Lieutenant Colonel Ivan Babić who was finally replaced by Colonel Viktor Pavičić.

At 'Proljet Kultura,' the regiment suffered 53 dead and 186 wounded in desperate hand-to-hand combat during the German attack on 27 July and subsequent overwhelming Soviet counterattack on 28 July. The worst recorded casualties before Stalingrad were 171 dead suffered in combat in various villages along the Samara River. Lt. Tomljenović, Lt. Tomislav Anić and Lt. Ivan Malički were killed in action during this period.

On 24 September 1942, during a visit to the 6th Army headquarters, Pavelić decorated and promoted some soldiers of the regiment. Two days later, the 100th Light Infantry Division was committed to the Battle of Stalingrad.

From that date, the number of legionnaires was fast reducing to a reported total of 1,403 altogether by 21 October 1942.  New fresh forces from Croatia were not added except for returns of sick and wounded and a few officers and staff.  A total of 22 (15%) officers were killed, 38 (26%) wounded, and 66 (45%) returned to Croatia from the original 147 Legion officers in total before fall.  Only 20 officers, including Mesic, remained in Stalingrad and one is treated as MIA.

Lt. Bakarec, who was the first Legion soldier ever to receive the Iron Cross 2nd class, was later wounded at Stalingrad and evacuated to Croatia, where he was killed on 5 July 1944.  Col. and later NDH general Markulj was tried and executed in Belgrade in September 1945. Markulj was court-martialled and executed after his capture by the Allies, who extradited him to the Yugoslav army in summer 1945.

Battle of Stalingrad
The 100th Jäger Division, including the 369th Croatian Reinforced Infantry Regiment, was involved in the heavy fighting for the "Red October" factory and for Mamayev Hill during the Battle of Stalingrad.  By November 1942, the fighting in their sector had become a locked stalemate with little progress.  By December 1942, the regiment had seen such intense combat that it was at 1/3 strength.  Despite the harsh conditions, the German high command credited the regiment with maintaining 'proper and military bearing'.

Sergeant Dragutin Podobnik was awarded Iron Cross Second and First Class and many Croat decorations, including one personally from Pavelic in September 1942 for his actions at Stalingrad.  Pavicic ordered a strategic building to be captured in the Red October factory. However, the armored vehicle support was delayed. Podobnik and his 18 men surprised the Soviets, captured the building without loss, and then handed it over to units from the German 54th Army Group. Sergeant Podobnik was later wounded and evacuated from Stalingrad and was killed in spring 1945 whilst serving in Pavelic's unit.

Several distinctions and citations are noted in war diaries and official military documents. There are several citations for bravery, valor, and leadership under fire for men of all ranks, including Lieutenant Rudolf Baričević.  In addition, the regimental doctors received distinctions for their actions and success in saving lives. One notable citation is that of Captain Madraš, who was wounded and was to be flown out of Stalingrad, but refused and instead stayed and fought with his men.

There were also acts of insubordination, dereliction of duty, and cowardly behavior cited in reports.  This was common for the demoralized and surrounded German and German-allied troops at Stalingrad, as the conditions were extremely harsh on the soldiers. Major Tomislav Brajkovic is noted to have desperately attempted to keep morale and discipline high.  However, due to major disagreements with other officers, including his commanding officer, he was transferred out of the regiment.

By 14 January, the regiment's section of the front line had reduced to 200 m held by some 90 remaining troops, all suffering from extreme cold, hunger, fatigue and lack of ammunition.  Colonel Viktor Pavicic reportedly left a resignation letter and disappeared from the theatre for good.  He recommended Colonel Mesić to General Sanne to be his successor. General Sanne officially reported that Pavicic was a deserter, but Sgt. Erwin Juric claimed that Pavicic had received written orders signed by Sanne to leave Stalingrad by air on 15 January.  During its last days at Stalingrad, the Legion desperately retrained about 700 inexperienced artillery and support soldiers to infantry combat duty.  The last official report from 21 January 1943 counted 443 infantry and 444 artillery soldiers in Stalingrad. Just before the surrender of the 6th Army at the end of January, about 1,000 wounded were flown out, and of the remaining men in the regiment, nearly 900 became prisoners of war.

Among the last Wehrmacht soldiers to leave Stalingrad by air were a group of 18 wounded and sick Croat legionnaires, including Lt. Barićević, who were flown out by Luftwaffe pilots and were landed on the last serviceable German airfield at Staljingradskaja near the 369th's artillery section positions on the night of 22 to 23 January 1943. The evacuation also saved the regiment's war diary and other documents. Several Luftwaffe planes had crashed the previous night, attempting to take off and land perilously close to fast-advancing Soviet forces; thus, fewer planes flew in for rescue missions. During the day of 23 January, Stalingradskaja airfield fell into Soviet hands.

Elements of the regiment fought as long as they could but ultimately surrendered to the Soviet General Vasiljev on 29 or 30 January 1943. In the three months between 21 October 1942 and 21 January 1943, they had lost 540 of 983 troops fighting for the Red October factory.

On 31 January 1943, General Friedrich Paulus announced the surrender of the German 6th Army. On 2 February, the Legion became Soviet prisoners of war, including all officers, approximately 100, mostly wounded, sick, and frostbitten combat soldiers, and some 600 other legionaries from artillery and support units. In the two weeks leading up to the capitulation, the 369th Regiment had lost 175 soldiers.

The Legion assembled at Beketovka on river Volga where they were joined by some 80,000 mainly German as well as Italian, Romanian and Hungarian POWs. They were sent on a forced march to Moscow, where they were joined by Croatian legionnaires from the Light Transport Brigade who had been attached to Italian forces on the Eastern Front.  From there, they were sent to work camps in Siberia.  Many died on the march due to starvation, hypothermia or disease.

Regiment veterans 
More than 1,000 legionnaires were evacuated from the Soviet Union and later Stalingrad by various means and for various reasons.  They were awarded the Croatian Legion 1941 Linden Leaf for their service and formed the core of a new unit, the 369th (Croatian) Infantry Division.

Aftermath

In late October 1944, the Yugoslav Legion numbering about 3,000 operated as part of the Red Army around Čačak during the Belgrade Offensive. This unit was formed in early 1944 partly from former members of the 369th (Croatian) Reinforced Infantry Regiment. It was commanded by the former Ustaše Lieutenant Colonel Marko Mesić assisted by Captain Milutin Perišić, a Serb. Both officers were praised by Soviet general Sergey Biryuzov.

In the Summer of 1943, one hundred legionaries and 6 officers, including Marko Mesic, were transferred to Suzdalj and later to Krasnogorsk near Moscow, where they met with most of the surviving Croat soldiers. At Krasnogorsk, the Soviets formed a new unit that utilized Royal Yugoslav uniforms (At the time, the Soviets did not recognize Tito's forces as a sovereign state). During early Soviet imprisonment, Col. Mesić appeared in Soviet media wearing a Royal Yugoslav Army uniform and Tito's flag. Upon news of this, the Ministry of the Armed Forces removed him from the Croatian Armed Forces and rescinded his awards.

Col. Mesić was given command by the Soviets of this newly formed 1st Yugoslav Volunteer Brigade, assembled from Yugoslav prisoners of war and volunteers living in Russia at the time. It is quite likely that most former Croatian soldiers of the 369. Regiment chose Communist Partisan service to avoid almost certain death in Soviet prisoner-of-war camps. During the first few months in captivity, Legionnaire numbers were reduced from some 700 to around 400 odd survivors or a 40% loss of life in under twelve months. The new Yugoslav partisan brigade, now wearing old Royal Yugoslav Army uniforms, was commanded by experienced former 369th Regiment Croat Legion officers like Lt.Col. Egon Zitnik, the former commander of the Light Transport Unit; Major Marijan Prislin, the former second in command of the 369. Regiment's artillery section; and Major Marijan Tulicic, the former artillery unit commander. New unit military training was very fast as most men were experienced soldiers.   As late as March 1944, they were joined by 200 more former 369th legionaries led by former 369th Stalingrad Doctor Bogoljub Modrijan and Lt. Vlahov, Lt. Tahtamišimov, Lt.Draženović and Lt. Ivan Vadlja, who was wounded at Stalingrad but missed the last flight out. They were transported to Yugoslavia in late 1944 under direct orders from Tito, where they were sacrificed in combat against superior German forces, suffering very high casualties. The few remaining survivors were suspected, and most were later convicted of being Soviet infiltrators by the partisans as well as Croat NDH authorities.

Commanders
 Colonel Ivan Markulj
 Lieutenant-Colonel Ivan Babić
 Colonel Viktor Pavičić
 Lieutenant-Colonel Marko Mesić

See also
 Croatian Air Force Legion
 Croatian Naval Legion
 Independent State of Croatia during World War II
 World War II in Yugoslavia

Notes

References

Sources

Books 
 
 

 
 
 
  Heroji za pogrešnu stvar: Bačeni na Staljingrad, Jutarnji list, 24. veljače 2008. 
 Milan Pojić Hrvatska pukovnija 369. na Istočnom bojištu 1941. - 1943.
 Welz H. Verratene Grenadiere. — Berlin, Deutscher Militärverlag, 1965

External links 
 Units location sketch from Stalingrad.
 ullstein bild search for " kroatische ostfront " returns so far rarely seen original German photos of 369th Legion
 Hrvatski legionari u Staljingradu za Pavelića, a u Srbiji za Tita 

Croatia–Germany relations
Croatian collaborators with Nazi Germany
Croatian Home Guard (World War II)
Foreign volunteer units of the Wehrmacht
German units at the Battle of Stalingrad
Infantry units and formations of the Wehrmacht
Military units and formations established in 1941
Military units and formations disestablished in 1943
Military units and formations of the Croatian Legion
Recipients of the Medal of Poglavnik Ante Pavelić for Bravery